"Burnin' Old Memories" is a song written by Larry Boone, Paul Nelson and Gene Nelson, and recorded by American country music artist Kathy Mattea.  It was released in July 1989 as the second single from the album Willow in the Wind.  The song was Mattea's fourth and final number one on the country chart.  It was number one for one week and spent fourteen weeks on the country chart.

Chart performance

Year-end charts

References

1989 singles
Kathy Mattea songs
Songs written by Larry Boone
Song recordings produced by Allen Reynolds
Mercury Records singles
Songs written by Paul Nelson (songwriter)
1989 songs
Songs written by Gene Nelson (songwriter)